Manko may refer to:

 Japanese profanity for female genitals (まんこ)
 Manko (poet), an Edo period Japanese poet
 Lake Man (Japanese: Manko), a wetland in Naha, Okinawa
 Kurenai Manko, a Japanese actress
 Manko Hime, princess who built the Yūtoku Inari Shrine 
 Manko, Jalandhar, a village in Punjab, India

See also
 Manco (disambiguation)